is a chemical and cosmetics company headquartered in Nihonbashi-Kayabacho, Chūō, Tokyo, Japan.

History 
Kao was established in 1887 by Tomiro Nagase as a manufacturer of domestic toiletry soap.

 1960s and 1970s
 During the 1960s and the 1970s, the company expanded to Taiwan and ASEAN countries, and also to oleochemicals in order to complement their main business. During this time, the company launched household products, laundry products, and industrial products to expand its revenue base (such as New Beads detergent, Humming fabric softener, Haiter bleach and Magiclean household cleaners).
 1980s
 During the 1980s, its products Merries diapers, Attack detergent, Bioré daily skincare and Bioré U daily body care, Curel (1986) and Sofina cosmetics were launched. During this time, Kao engaged in several joint ventures (haircare in Europe, Nivea in Japan with Beiersdorf), and acquisitions (Andrew Jergens Company in 1988, Goldwell AG in 1989) in North America and Europe. During this period, Kao also expanded to the manufacture of floppy disks.
 1990s and 2000s
 During the 1990s and 2000s, the company expanded into China and Vietnam—countries that, during that time, were opening up their economies to the rest of the world. Also, the company expanded into food products with Econa and Healthya. Additionally, the company made floppy disks and optical discs during this time. It also continued to acquire businesses (John Frieda in 2002, Molton Brown in 2005 and Kanebo Cosmetics in 2006).

In 2020, Kao Corporation was ranked the #4 out of 42 companies in the Corporate Knights Industry Group’s Personal Care and Cleaning Products category, recognized for its excellence in innovation capacity, employee retention as well as clean revenue, or revenue from all goods and services which have clear environmental benefits. For the company's national and international experience in sustainable development, and eco-friendly products, the Environment Possibility Award conferred the "Environmental Heroes of the Year" to Kao Corporation in 2020.

In 2021 two of Kao’s products, the 3D Space Shampoo Sheet and the Space Laundry Sheet, were chosen to be sent to the International Space Station, with the Japan Aerospace Exploration Agency (JAXA) in 2022.

Brand ownership
 Attack
 Ban
 Bioré
 Biozet
 Curel
 Goldwell
 Guhl
 Healthya
 Jergens
 John Frieda
 Kanebo
 Kate
 KMS
 Laurier
 Liese
 Magiclean
 MegRhythm
 Merries
 Merit
 Molton Brown
 Oribe 
 Segreta
 Sensai
 Sofina
 Success

References

External links 

 Kao Worldwide website in English
 Kao Japan website
 Kao corporate website in English
 Kao Brands Company, Kao's US subsidiary

Companies listed on the Tokyo Stock Exchange
Chemical companies based in Tokyo
Cosmetics companies of Japan
Japanese brands
Chemical companies established in 1887
Japanese companies established in 1887
Multinational companies headquartered in Japan